Pink Arrow is an unincorporated community in Navajo County, Arizona, United States.

References

Unincorporated communities in Navajo County, Arizona
Unincorporated communities in Arizona